Zamzama Park is a 26 acre park located in the phase 5 area of Defence Housing Authority in Karachi, Sindh, Pakistan. It has jogging tracks, walking paths, roller blading enclosure, refreshment stand, and playground. The display center and head office of Pakistan Bonsai Society is also located inside the park near gate no.2. The park is hosts an annual bonsai exhibition as well. 

Zamzama is a posh locality situated in the Clifton Town in Karachi, the largest city of Pakistan. It is a highly developed commercial area with residential accommodation as well. Famous branded shops are in this area.

See also 
 List of parks and gardens in Pakistan
 List of parks and gardens in Lahore
 List of parks and gardens in Karachi

References

External links
 Official website

Defence, Karachi
Parks in Karachi